Olivaria brewery (also known as Olivaria or Alivaria) is one of the oldest breweries in Belarus, and is the oldest of presently existent breweries in the country. It was founded in 1864 in Minsk. The brewery has a 29% market share in the beer market in Belarus, and its primary product, Alivaria-brand beer has a market share of around 18%. Production increased by 43% in 2008, and in 2011, the brewery was in third place in the market share of beer in Belarus.

As of May 2015, Carlsberg Group holds 67.8% of shares in the brewery, and the European Bank for Reconstruction and Development holds 21% of shares. Remaining shares are owned by various individuals. European Bank for Reconstruction and Development financed the brewery to assist in its expansion and modernization.

History 
It began operations on January 29, 1864 in Minsk. The brewery was nationalized in 1917, but become a joint stock company in 1994.

Varieties 
Olivaria Brewery's primary product is Alivaria-brand beer, which has a market share of around 18% in Belarus. It also specialises in the production of kvass.

See also
 Baltic Beverages Holding

References

External links 
 Official website

Beer in Belarus
Drink companies of the Soviet Union
Companies based in Minsk
Companies established in 1864
Belarusian brands
Companies nationalised by the Soviet Union